This article lists the winners and nominees for the Billboard Music Award for Top Hot 100 Artist. The award has been given out since 1992 and since its conception only Destiny's Child, Usher, Drake and The Weeknd have won the award twice.

Winners and nominees
Winners are listed first and highlighted in bold.

1990s

2000s

2010s

2020s

Multiple wins and nominations

Wins
2 wins
 Destiny's Child
 Usher
 Drake
 The Weeknd

Nominations

5 nominations
 Drake

4 nominations
 Rihanna
 Usher
 The Weeknd

3 nominations
 Katy Perry
 Taylor Swift
 Bruno Mars

2 nominations
 Justin Bieber
 Mariah Carey
 DaBaby
 Destiny's Child
 Imagine Dragons
 Maroon 5
 Ariana Grande

References

Billboard awards